Grover Cleveland High School or Cleveland High School is the name of several public high schools in the United States, named—except as noted—for President Grover Cleveland:

 Grover Cleveland High School (New Jersey), Caldwell, New Jersey
 Grover Cleveland High School (Buffalo, New York), Buffalo, New York
 Grover Cleveland High School (Queens), Queens, New York

 Cleveland High School (Los Angeles), Los Angeles, California
 Cleveland High School (Cleveland, Mississippi), Cleveland, Mississippi
 Cleveland High School (St. Louis, Missouri), St. Louis, Missouri
 Cleveland High School (North Carolina), Clayton, North Carolina, named for the community of Cleveland
 Cleveland High School (Portland, Oregon), Portland, Oregon
 Cleveland High School (Tennessee), Cleveland, Tennessee, named for its location
 Cleveland High School (Seattle), Seattle, Washington
 V. Sue Cleveland High School, Rio Rancho, New Mexico, named for a local school official

 high schools in Cleveland
 Cleveland, Ohio, public high schools, see Cleveland Metropolitan School District
 Cleveland, Mississippi, public high schools, see Cleveland School District
 Cleveland County, England, public secondary schools, see List of schools in Redcar and Cleveland

See also
Cleveland School (disambiguation)
Cleveland Hill High School, Cheektowaga, New York